Tronvoll is a surname. Notable people with the surname include:

 Kjetil Tronvoll (born 1966), Norwegian professor at the Norwegian Centre for Human Rights
 Mette Tronvoll (born 1965), Norwegian photo artist
 Olav Tronvoll (born 1986), Norwegian ski mountaineer
 Ove-Erik Tronvoll (born 1972), Norwegian ski mountaineer and cross-country skier